Walter Feyerabend (3 December 1891 – 17 April 1962) was a German equestrian. He competed in two events at the 1928 Summer Olympics.

References

1891 births
1962 deaths
German male equestrians
Olympic equestrians of Germany
Equestrians at the 1928 Summer Olympics
Sportspeople from Königsberg